Periodic elections for the Tasmanian Legislative Council were held on 6 May 2013. The three seats up for election were Montgomery, Nelson and Pembroke.

Montgomery
The electoral division of Montgomery was created in 1999, and was held by independent MLC Sue Smith until her retirement on 4 May 2013. Smith had been re-elected unopposed at the previous periodic election in 2007, so no swings are calculated in the results below.

Nelson
The electoral division of Nelson has been held by the independent MLC and Legislative Council President Jim Wilkinson since 1999. Allocation of preferences ceases when one candidate gains more than 50 per cent of the vote.

|- style="background-color:#E9E9E9"
! colspan="6" align="left"|After transfer of Willink's votes

Pembroke
The previous election in Pembroke had been a by-election held on 1 August 2009, which was won by Vanessa Goodwin of the Liberal Party.

References

2013 elections in Australia
Elections in Tasmania
2010s in Tasmania
May 2013 events in Australia